The Parvarim (Hebrew: הפרברים, haparvarim, lit: "The Suburbs") is an Israeli band that was first formed in 1960. The band was originally founded by the duo Nissim Menachem (1938–2016) and Yossi Khoury. For a brief while they were joined by Jimmy Siman Tov who joined in 1965 but left after six months. In 1977, Menachem became religious and left the group, he was replaced by Uri Harpaz. The group's name means "the suburbs" and is a reference to the founders' being raised in the Kerem HaTeimanim suburb of Jaffa. The name "Parvarim" were once a reference to the poorer areas of a city.

After Nissim Menachem left The Parvarim,
He went on to study at the yeshiva Orot Hatorah in Bat Yam.

In 2015, after 37 years with The Parvarim, Uri Harpaz left the group to record a solo album. Shortly afterwards, Khoury announced his new partner is Hagai Rehavia.

Discography

First formation
 1967 - בשירי עם ישראלים / B'shirei Am Yisraelim 
 1967 - בשירת לאדינו / B'shirat Ladino
 1968 - יש לי אהבה / Yesh Li Ahavah
 1969 - אדום עתיק / Adom Atik
 1969 - במצב הח"ן / B'matzav Hakhen
 1969 - Sing International
 1971 - אני אוהב אותך) בשקט, כמעט בסוד / (Ani Ohev Otakh) B'sheket Kim'at b'Sod
 1972 - בשירי סיימון וגרפונקל / B'shirei Simon V'Garfunkel
 1974 - שתי גיטרות והפרברים/ Shtei Gitarot V'haparvarim

Second formation
 החולמים אחר השמש - 1978 / Hakholmim Akhar Hashemesh
 פרברים טרופיקל - 1981 / Parvarim Tropikal
 שיר אהבה רחוק  - 1983 / Shir Ahavah Rakhok
 הדודאים והפרברים - 1985 / Hadudaim V'haparvarim
 מוזיקה - 1989 / Muzika

References

External links
Official website
Hebrew Wikipedia

Musical groups established in 1960
1960 establishments in Israel